Vladimir Mikhailovich Agapov (born 18 November 1933 in Moscow) is a retired Soviet football player and coach.

Honours
 Soviet Top League winner: 1953.
 Soviet Cup winner: 1955.

International career
Agapov played his only game for USSR on 30 August 1958 in a friendly against Czechoslovakia.

External links
  Profile

1933 births
Living people
Soviet footballers
Soviet Union international footballers
Soviet football managers
Soviet Top League players
FC Spartak Moscow players
PFC CSKA Moscow players
Russian footballers
Footballers from Moscow
PFC CSKA Moscow managers

Association football forwards